David Marchant AM (born November 1954) is an Australian railway executive.

Biography 
Marchant was born in November 1954 in Grafton, New South Wales, Australia.  His early career included a period as advisor to former New South Wales Premier Neville Wran. He also became the Deputy Director General for the New South Wales Department of Community Services in 1989, responsible for the delivery of services to disadvantaged individuals, families and communities, and the Group General Manager for Sydney Water in 1993, a New South Wales government-owned, statutory corporation. During this time he was also working concurrently as the Managing Director for Australian Water Technologies Pty Ltd. He  worked for the Pacific Gas and Electric Company from 1996 to 1997 through its subsidiary company the PG&E Corporation, Australasia, as the Senior General Manager, Development.

Since leaving the railway industry Marchant has been appointed Managing Director of Lendlease Infrastructure Services and the Managing Director of Lend Lease Engineering in 2013, integrating the Abigroup and Baulderstone, Infrastructure Services and Project Management and Construction businesses. In July 2014 he was appointed to the Board of Airservices Australia.

Marchant became a Member of the Order of Australia in the 2013 Australia Day Honours List for significant service to the rail industry through national structural reform and infrastructure upgrades.

Career 
After working in legal and executive roles for the public and private sector, Marchant was appointed in June 1998 the inaugural Chief Executive Officer (CEO) for the Australian Rail Track Corporation (ARTC), created through the retention of the Federal government's Track Access Unit in November 1997 after the division and sale of Australian National's business assets. The ARTC was conceived as a 'one-stop shop' for train operators seeking access to the interstate network. The ARTC commenced a five-year lease on the Victorian interstate tracks from VicTrack in July 1999, which gave it control over the interstate rail network from Albury and Broken Hill through to Kalgoorlie. Marchant used his political knowledge to present a strong business case for Federal funding for the interstate network and in 1999 the government provided ARTC with $250 million that would be spent over the next several years to improve rail network infrastructure.

Under Marchant's direction, the ARTC in the early 2000's expanded its business, as well as the trackage that came under its control, and in 2001 it was granted rights from the then West Australian track owner, WestNet Rail to sell track access to interstate rail operators between Kalgoorlie and Perth for fifteen years. In addition, the New South Wales government entered into an agreement for ARTC in September 2004 to lease the interstate and Hunter Valley tracks from the Rail Infrastructure Corporation for a period of 60 years. Subsequently in 2010, ARTC negotiated a lease with the Queensland government for the management of track access of the Queensland standard gauge rail line from the New South Wales border, to Acacia Ridge and Brisbane, also for 60 years. Marchant also facilitated the completion of concrete sleeper insertion over the entire ARTC interstate network of 8,500 kilometers that, when combined with other track upgrading and strengthening of culverts and bridges, provided greater network reliability and lower maintenance costs.

During Marchant's time as CEO of ARTC, he was heavily involved in other areas of the rail industry:
 Director, Rail Industry Safety and Standards Board, 2005-2010
 Chairman, Australasian Rail Association, 2009-2011
 Director, Australasian Railway Association, 1999-2011
 Director  of the Hunter Valley Coal Chain Coordination Company Pty Ltd, 2009-2011

Marchant stepped down from his role as ARTC's CEO in 2011 after thirteen years at the helm.

Marchant is currently serving on the boards of Air Services Australia and QR.

References

Living people
1954 births
Australian chief executives
Members of the Order of Australia